Sam Philipe is an Israeli sculptor. He is known for his sculptures of biblical and New Testament figures.

Biography
Shlomo (Sam) Philipe was born in Jerusalem to an old Jerusalem family. After serving in the Israel Defense Forces as a combat medic, he spent a year in New York City restoring antique furniture and studying art. When he returned to Israel, he earned a living sculpting animals in chocolate.

Art career
Sam Philipe opened a studio in Jerusalem in 1989. In addition to sculpture, he began to design jewelry and Jewish ceremonial art.

Philipe's sculptures have been presented to government leaders around the world as gifts from the Israeli government. Philipe's statue "Jesus' blessing" was presented to Pope John Paul II on behalf of the Ministry of Religious Affairs. King Hussein of Jordan received a sculpture embodying Isaiah's prophecy of the lion and the lamb; George H. W. Bush, an elephant with the Star of David; and Princess Diana, a guardian angel. Yitzhak Rabin was presented with a sculpture depicting a paratrooper praying at the Western Wall.

Outdoor sculptures by Philipe have been installed at various locations in Jerusalem, among them Ammunition Hill and Yad Labanim Soldiers House near Sacher Park. Many of his smaller sculptures, crafted from sterling silver and 24 karat gold, are mounted on polished stone bases using stones from the desert. Philipe often uses blocks of Jerusalem stone or black basalt from the Galilee as pedestals for his work.

In February 2011, his bronze sculpture "Binding of Isaac" was displayed at Mamilla Mall as part of its "Stories of the Bible" exhibit.

"Mother and child," a sculpture by Philipe, is displayed at the Revi Karuna Memorial Museum in Alleppey, India. His seven-foot bronze statue of the Prodigal son was installed in the museum courtyard in March 2012.

"Reut" (Camaraderie in Arms) is a 10-foot bronze on Mount Scopus, overlooking the Judean Desert, depicting a combat medic embracing a wounded soldier. His inspiration for the work was an Israeli army doctor, Uri Freund, who was awarded the IDF medal of distinguished service for going out under heavy crossfire to rescue his wounded commander.

To mark the 70th anniversary of the voyage of the SS Exodus, Philipe designed a memorial sculpture featuring a bronze relief of the Land of Israel. The monument was unveiled at Haifa Port in July 2017.

Philipe's goal is to "reach God through art." He creates sculptures based on Bible themes in the belief that his work transports viewers back to ancient times and allows them to feel a connection to the Bible in their own life.

Selected projects

SS Exodus Memorial, Haifa  2017

The Exodus, nicknamed the "Ship that Launched a Nation" by writer Ruth Gruber, was an American Aliyah Bet ship that attempted to bring in 5,400 desperate Holocaust survivors. The Exodus' story fundamentally affected the United Nations vote on the United Nations Partition Plan for Palestine dividing Mandatory Palestine into two States, one Jewish and one Arab. The sculpture consists of a relief map of Israel with a model of the Exodus anchor.

Machal Memorial, Ammunition Hill, Jerusalem 2018

The Memorial commemorates the 5,000 foreign volunteers who helped defend the new state of Israel in the 1948 War of Independence. The rock is adorned with sculpted models of the three military corps that the volunteers served in, Navy, Air Force and Army. .

Anne Frank Children's Human Rights Memorial, Ma'aleh Adumim

Philipe's Anne Frank Children's Human Rights Memorial combines interpretive and realistic art with a life-size representation of Frank sitting at her desk in the secret annex with a bare light bulb hanging above her head as the Nazis march through the streets below. The plaque on the base of the sculpture reads: "Children are the ultimate victims of adult hatred, bigotry, and ignorance." 

  
Golan Heights Eagle Menorah,  Golan Heights

The large bronze eagle and menorah sculpture is modeled upon the indigenous Golan Eagle and the depiction of the Menorah found in the 5th-century Golan Heights synagogue, Ein Keshatot. Trump Heights and the Golan Eagle Menorah sculpture were dedicated in appreciation to President Donald J. Trump.

Temple Lions, Beit Shean 2019

Inspired by a basalt relief discovered in archeological excavations in Beit Shean and attributed to a local Temple from the 14th BCE.

Departure and Expulsion Memorial, Jerusalem 

Based on the iconic image of Jewish Yemenite refugees fleeing in the desert attempting to reach  Israel. Inscription: “With the birth of the State of Israel, over 850,000 Jews were forced from Arab Lands and Iran. The desperate refugees were welcomed by Israel. The Memorial was conceived and funded by the Jewish American Society for Historic Preservation.

Tree of Life, Ma'aleh Adumim

In June 2022, Tree of Life, a 60-ton steel and concrete sculpture based on Kabbalistic symbolism, was installed in Park Shamir overlooking a lake at the entrance to Ma'aleh Adumim. The sculpture, shaped like the trunk of an old, gnarled olive tree, is 18 meters high and 7 meters wide.

Hands of Choice, Tzfat

The Hands of Choice is a memorial in Tzfat created to honor ordinary Jews who chose to save Jews, even at the cost of their own lives. The design is two upturned hands cupping a Star of David.  Each facet of the Star has a Jerusalem stone panel inscribed with the names  of these heroic Jews."

UN Partition Plan Memorial, Netanya

Philipe's monument, featuring a giant shofar, was unveiled in Netanya on November 29, 2022, to mark the 75th anniversary of the UN Partition Plan. According to the sculptor, his inspiration was a verse from the Hebrew prayerbook: "Blow a big trumpet for our freedom and let there be a miracle to collect our dispersed."

Gallery

See also
Visual arts in Israel
Religious art
Outdoor sculpture

References

Living people
Israeli Jews
People from Jerusalem
Israeli jewellery designers
20th-century Israeli sculptors
21st-century Israeli sculptors
Year of birth missing (living people)